Probability function may refer to:

 Probability distribution
 Probability axioms, which define a probability function
 Probability measure, a real-valued function on a probability space

See Also
 Probability distribution function (disambiguation)